The following is a complete episode list for the Australian children's series The Saddle Club, which began airing on ABC on 30 April 2001 and ended on 10 April 2009.

The series revolves around the experiences of three best friends Carole Hanson, Stevie Lake, and Lisa Atwood who form The Saddle Club after recognizing their equal passions for horse riding and the horses themselves. However, their friendship is detested by fellow riders Veronica diAngelo and Kristi Cavanaugh. The Saddle Club's friendship is admired by Megan, Sam, and in Series 3 new students Desi and Simon. The girl's friendship is envied by Ashley, Melanie, and Jess.

Series overview

Episodes

Series 1 (2001)

Series 2 (2003)

Series 3 (2008–09)

References

External links
 
 

Lists of Australian children's television series episodes
Lists of Australian drama television series episodes